DNA-directed RNA polymerases I, II, and III subunit RPABC1 is a protein that in humans is encoded by the POLR2E gene.

This gene encodes the fifth largest subunit of RNA polymerase II, the polymerase responsible for synthesizing messenger RNA in eukaryotes. This subunit is shared by the other two DNA-directed RNA polymerases and is present in two-fold molar excess over the other polymerase subunits. An interaction between this subunit and a hepatitis virus transactivating protein has been demonstrated, suggesting that interaction between transcriptional activators and the polymerase can occur through this subunit. A pseudogene is located on chromosome 11.

Interactions
POLR2E has been shown to interact with TAF15, POLR2C, POLR2G, POLR2H, POLR2A, POLR2B, POLR2L and GTF2F2.

References

Further reading